Imperial Venus is a 1962 French-Italian historical film directed by Jean Delannoy and starring Gina Lollobrigida, Stephen Boyd and Raymond Pellegrin. It depicts the life of Pauline Bonaparte, the sister of Napoleon. For her performance Lollobrigida won the David di Donatello for best actress and the Nastro d'Argento for the same category.

Plot

Cast
 Gina Lollobrigida as Paulette Bonaparte 
 Stephen Boyd as  Jules de Canouville 
 Raymond Pellegrin as Napoleon Bonaparte 
 Micheline Presle as Josephine 
 Gabriele Ferzetti as Freron 
 Massimo Girotti  as Leclerc 
 Marco Guglielmi as  Junot
Lilla Brignone  as  Letizia
Ernesto Calindri  as Cardinal Fesch
Andrea Checchi as Doctor
Giulio Bosetti as  Prince Camillo Borghese
Gianni Santuccio as  Antonio Canova
Maria Laura Rocca as  Laura De Barral
Giustino Durano as  Bousque
Liana Del Balzo ad Princess Borghese
Andrea Bosic as Del Val
Attilio Dottesio

References

External links

Imperial Venus at Variety Distribution

1960s historical films
1962 films
Films directed by Jean Delannoy
French historical films
1960s French-language films
Italian historical films
1960s French films
1960s Italian films